The M100 is a blowback-operated semi-automatic rifle chambered in .22 LR, manufactured by Calico Light Weapons Systems in Elgin, Oregon, United States. It was originally designed and released in the 1980s  to be of use to law enforcement and military markets due to its slim profile.

Legislation
Possessing a unique 100-round helical-fed magazine mounted on top of the weapon, the introduction of the Federal assault weapons ban made manufacture of the Calico family of weapons for sale to civilians illegal, until the legislation expired on September 13, 2004, in accordance with its sunset provision. 

The company is now allowed to build the exotic firearms in their original configuration.

References

.22 LR semi-automatic rifles